Itaú de Minas is a Brazilian municipality located in the center of the state of Minas Gerais. Its population  was 16,199 people living in a total area of 154 km². The city belongs to the meso-region of Sul e Sudoeste de Minas and to the micro-region of Passos.  It became a municipality in 1987.

Location
The city center of Itaú de Minas is located at an elevation of 735 meters a short distance west of regional centerPassos.  Neighboring  municipalities are:  Passos (N and E),  Fortaleza de Minas (S), Pratápolis (SW), and Cássia (W).

Distances
Belo Horizonte: 356 km
Cássia: 31 km
Passos: 21 km
São Sebastião do Paraíso: 34 km

Economic activities
Services, industry, and agriculture are the main economic activities.  The city has a cement factory: CCPI - Companhia de Cimento Portland Itaú.  The GDP in 2005 was approximately R$226 million, with 56 million reais from taxes, 76 million reais from services, 89 million reais from industry, and 4 million reais from agriculture.  In the industrial sector there were 110 small industries employing 994 workers (2005).  There were 89 rural producers on 9,000 hectares of land.  Approximately 220 persons were occupied in agriculture.  The main crops are coffee, beans, and corn.  There were 7,000 head of cattle, of which 2,000 were milk cows (2006).

There are 4 banks (2007). In the vehicle fleet there were 2,902 automobiles, 231 trucks, 210 pickup trucks, 29 buses, and 606 motorcycles (2007).

Health and education
In the health sector there were 8 health clinics and 1 hospital with 44 beds (2005).  Educational needs of 2,300 students were attended to by 7 primary schools, 2 middle schools, and 5 pre-primary schools.

Municipal Human Development Index: 0.796 (2000)
State ranking: 51 out of 853 municipalities 
National ranking: 633 out of 5,138 municipalities 
Literacy rate: 93%
Life expectancy: 71 (average of males and females)

In 2000 the per capita monthly income of R$264.00 was below the state average of R$276.00 and below the national average of R$297.00.  Poços de Caldas had the highest per capita monthly income in 2000 with R$435.00.  The lowest was Setubinha with R$73.00.

The highest ranking municipality in Minas Gerais in 2000 was Poços de Caldas with 0.841, while the lowest was Setubinha with 0.568.  Nationally the highest was São Caetano do Sul in São Paulo with 0.919, while the lowest was Setubinha.  In more recent statistics (considering 5,507 municipalities) Manari in the state of Pernambuco has the lowest rating in the country—0,467—putting it in last place.

References

See also
 List of municipalities in Minas Gerais

Municipalities in Minas Gerais